is a Japanese voice actress and singer from Tokyo, Japan. She is represented by Ken Production. She won a "Best Actress in Supporting Roles" award at the 10th Seiyu Awards for her roles in Prison School and Sailor Moon Crystal. She is well known for her anime voice roles as Hilda in Beelzebub, Hinagiku Katsura in Hayate the Combat Butler, and many others.

She and fellow voice actress Hitomi Nabatame formed a voice acting unit called "Hitomi Nabatame and Shizuka Itō". Together they are known by the name , which is Japanese for "a single droplet". In 2012, she announced that she had gotten married. On April 30, 2020, Itō announced that she had gotten divorced.

Filmography

Television animation

Original video animation (OVA)

Baldr Force Exe Resolution – Kaira Kirusten
D-Frag! – Takao
Dogs: Bullets & Carnage – Naoto Fuyumine
Top wo Nerae 2! – Pacica Peska Pelcicum
I"s Pure – Iori Yoshizuki
Maria-sama ga Miteru 3rd Season – Rei Hasekura
Negima!? – Misa Kakizaki
Pinky:St – Noriko, woman 1
Shakugan no Shana SP: Koi to Onsen no Kōgai Gakushū! – Wilhelmina Carmel
To Heart 2 – Tamaki Kosaka
xxxHOLiC: Shunmuki – Himawari Kunogi
Sky Girls (2006) – Eika Ichijō
Shirobako (2015) – Aya, Catherine Weller
Amanchu!: Yakusoku no Natsu to Atarashii Omoide no Koto (2017) – Mato Katori
Food Wars!: Shokugeki no Soma (2017) – Rindō Kobayashi

Film animation

Drama CDs

Asobi ni iku yo! (Durel)
Cyborg 009 Drama Album: Love Stories (Nana Kashima)
D-Frag! (Takao)
Dogs: Bullets & Carnage (Naoto Fuyumine)
Hayate X Blade (Inori Sae)
Houkago Play (Kanojo)

Video games
Samurai Shodown V Special (Mizuki Rashojin)
Fate/unlimited Codes (Luviagelita Edelfelt)
Princess Connect! Re:Dive (2020) (Io)
Fate/Grand Order (2019) (Astraea)
Extraordinary Ones (2019) (Japanese Minnie announcements voice)
Tales of Hearts (2008) (Innes Lorenz)
 Bloodborne (2015) (Vicar Amelia)
Overwatch (Widowmaker)
Nioh (Tachibana Ginchiyo)
Another Eden (Shanie)
Final Fantasy XIV: Stormblood (Yotsuyu)
Girls' Frontline (KSG, Executioner) (2016)
Azur Lane (2018) (IJN Mogami, RN Littorio, MNF Algérie)
Sekiro: Shadows Die Twice (Emma)
Fire Emblem: Three Houses (Byleth (female))
The King of Fighters All Star (Pretty Billy, Elisabeth Blanctorche)
Arknights (2019) (Schwarz)
Punishing: Gray Raven (2019) (Ayla)
Super Smash Bros Ultimate (Byleth (Female))
Fire Emblem Heroes (2020) (Byleth (Female), Rickard)
Touhou Spell Bubble (Yukari Yakumo)
Ring Fit Adventure (Ring (Female))
Fairy Tail (Flare Corona)
The Sealed Ampoule (2021) (Irene) 
Monster Hunter Rise (Minoto)
Kantai Collection (Saratoga, Asakaze, Matsukaze) (2013)
Xenoblade Chronicles 2 (JP Dub Name: Kagutsuchi) (Brighid) (2017)
Blue Archive (2021) (Shun Sunohara)
The King of Fighters XV (Elisabeth Blanctorche)
Counter: Side (Mansion Master)
Bravely Default: Brilliant Lights (2022) (Sandra Cassandra)
Return to Shironagasu Island (2022) (Gisele Reed)
Witch on the Holy Night (2022) (Ritsuka Suse)
Path to Nowhere (2022) (Eirene)
Master Detective Archives: Rain Code (2023) (Martina Electro)

Unknown date
Granblue Fantasy (Sutera)
Gadget Trial (Nei)
Jokyou Kaishi! (Keiko Yada)
To Heart 2 (Tamaki Kosaka)
Mabino Kakeru Star (Hinano Katase)
Otomedius (Esmeralda)
Gensosuikoden IV (Mizuki)
Chaos Rings Omega (Cyllis)
Mahou Sensei Negima! 1-Jikanme -Okochama Sensei wa Mahou Tsukai (Misa Kakizaki)
Mahou Sensei Negima! 2-Jikanme Tatakau Otome-tachi! Mahora Dai Undoukai SP! (Misa Kakizaki)
Tenkuu Danzai Skelter+Heaven (Midori Matsumura)
Duel Savior Destiny (Kaede Hiiragi)
Zoids Infinity EX NEO (Kotona Elegance)
Dokapon The World
EVE～new generation～ (Efi)
Rockman ZX (Pandora)
Gunparade Orchestra Midori no Shou ~ Ookami to Kare no Shōnen ~ (牧原輝春)
Yoake Mae Yori Ruri Iro Na: Brighter than dawning blue (Wreathlit Noel)
WILD ARMS the Vth Vanguard (Avril van Frulu)
Metroid: Other M (MB / Melissa Bergman)
Muv-Luv Alternative (Touko Kazama)
Katahane (Dua Carlstedt)
Luminous Arc (Vanessa)
Drakengard 3 (Five)
Routes (Lisa Vixen)
Zack & Wiki: Quest for Barbaros' Treasure (Rock Rose)
Amagami (Haruka Morishima)
Hayate no Gotoku! Nightmare Paradise (Hinagiku Katsura)
Rune Factory 3 (Karin)
Shining Force Feather (Alfin)
Abyss of the Sacrifice (Oruga)
Twinkle Crusaders (Kujoh Helena)
Trauma Team (JP version name: HOSPITAL) (Tomoe Tachibana)
Gloria Union (Elisha, Kyra)
Granado Espada (Emilia Giannino, Emilia the Sage, & Reckless Emilia)
Skylanders: Spyro's Adventure (Cali)
Skylanders: Giants (Cali)
League of Legends (Lux)
Sword Art Online: Hollow Realization (Kizmel)
The Seven Deadly Sins: Grand Cross (Eastin Anamabyllis)
Honkai: Star Rail (Kafka)

Radio
To Heart 2 (Tamaki Kosaka)

Vomic
Beelzebub (Hildagarde)
Cloth Road (Jennifer)
World's End Harem (Mira Suou)

Dubbing

Live-action

Animation

Discography

Albums

EP

Singles

References

External links
 
Official agency profile at Ken Production 

1980 births
Living people
Japanese women pop singers
Japanese video game actresses
Japanese voice actresses
Ken Production voice actors
Singers from Tokyo
Voice actresses from Tokyo
21st-century Japanese actresses
21st-century Japanese women singers
21st-century Japanese singers